Anthony John Diamond (born 23 August 1968) is a former professional footballer who played as a forward. Born in England, he made one appearance for the Northern Ireland U23 national team.

Career
Rochdale-born Diamond started his career at Blackburn Rovers. He made his debut in September 1986 in a 6–1 win against Sunderland, and scored his first goal for the club in January 1987 in a single-goal victory over Oldham Athletic. In October 1988 he was loaned out to Wigan Athletic, and made his debut for the club in a 2–1 defeat against Southend United. He made six appearances during his spell at the club, scoring two goals.

In 1989, he represented the Northern Ireland under-23s in a 3–0 defeat against the Republic of Ireland.

He signed for Blackpool during the 1989-90 season, but made just three appearances for the club as Blackpool were relegated to the Fourth Division. He scored one goal for the Seasiders, in a 3–0 victory over Mansfield Town at Field Mill on 23 September. After being released in 1990 by incoming manager Graham Carr, Diamond dropped into non-League football.

References

External links
Profile at Post War Football League database

1968 births
Living people
Footballers from Rochdale
Association footballers from Northern Ireland
Association football forwards
English Football League players
Blackburn Rovers F.C. players
Wigan Athletic F.C. players
Blackpool F.C. players
Chorley F.C. players
Atherton Laburnum Rovers F.C. players